(born December 28, 1987, in Yao, Osaka, Japan) is a gravure model, model and race queen, former member of Japanese idol pop group v-u-den that was associated with Hello! Project. She remained within the group until its disbandment in 2008, after which point she was contracted with Up-Front Agency. She is currently no longer in the entertainment business, having retired to study beauty.

Biography

History 
In June 2004, Okada passed Hello! Project Egg Audition 2004, the first audition to find Hello! Project trainees (known as Hello! Pro Eggs), along with 32 other girls. She was chosen out of over 10,500 applicants. Two months later, in August, she was put into a group with Morning Musume member Rika Ishikawa and sole "Hello! Project Shin Unit Audition" winner Erika Miyoshi. The group was named "V-u-den". Their debut single, "Koi no Nukegara", was released on September 23.

In January 2006, she was added to the new Hello! Project kickball team Metro Rabbits H.P. Her debut photobook, photographed in Okinawa and titled "I Doll" (a pun on "Idol"), was released in February, with the DVD released the following month. Okada was cast in the film Sukeban Deka: Codename Saki Asamiya as Tae Konno, released on September 30, 2006.

In 2008, it was announced that V-u-den would disband after their June concert tour. Her activities as a singer ceased, and she began to do gravure work, as well as appearing on variety shows.

On March 31, 2009, Okada graduated from Hello! Project along with the entire Elder Club, as part of a mass graduation. She also appeared at the Elder Club's final concert together the month before. She did, however, remain with Up-Front Agency, transferring to the Kansai division and moving to Osaka. On June 23, 2010, she announced her intent to retire from celebrity life. Her contract with Up-Front Kansai was terminated on June 30. She has since ceased all activities, intending to study beauty, hair and make-up, a subject in which she has long had an interest. Due to her previous graduation with the Elder Club, she is considered to have graduated from Hello! Project, even though she did not receive a graduation upon her contract termination with the Kansai division. In 2011 it was found that she is currently signed with an agency called Grace Agency and she is working as a model and a race queen.

In April 2013, Okada launched her clothing brand, Ivora.

Releases

Photobooks

DVDs 
 I Doll (2006-03-01)

Appearances

Movies 
 Sukeban Deka: Codename Saki Asamiya as Tae Konno (2006-09-30)

TV shows

Radio

External links 
twitter account
ameblo account

References

1987 births
Living people
Japanese television personalities
V-u-den members
People from Yao, Osaka
Musicians from Osaka Prefecture